Mecistogaster lucretia is a species of narrow-winged damselfly in the family Coenagrionidae. It is found in South America.

Subspecies
These two subspecies belong to the species Mecistogaster lucretia:
 Mecistogaster lucretia hauxwelli Selys, 1886
 Mecistogaster lucretia lucretia (Drury, 1773)

References

Further reading

 

Coenagrionidae
Articles created by Qbugbot
Insects described in 1773
Taxa named by Dru Drury